Hemistomia minutissima is a species of minute freshwater snails with an operculum, aquatic gastropod molluscs or micromolluscs in the family Hydrobiidae. This species is endemic to Australia, where it is only known from the Erskine Valley, on the southern part of Lord Howe Island.

References

External links

Hemistomia
Gastropods of Australia
Gastropods described in 1982
Taxonomy articles created by Polbot